The Tyler Elbertas was a South Central League baseball team based in Tyler, Texas, United States that played in 1912. They were the first known professional baseball team based in Tyler and until 1924, were the only team to ever come out of that city.

Cotton Tierney, who played in the major leagues from 1920 to 1926, played for the team.

References

Sports in Tyler, Texas
Baseball teams established in 1912
Defunct minor league baseball teams
Professional baseball teams in Texas
Defunct baseball teams in Texas
1912 establishments in Texas
Baseball teams disestablished in 1924